Juneau County is the name of a county and a borough in the United States:

 Juneau City and Borough, Alaska (the equivalent to a county in Alaska is a borough)
 Juneau County, Wisconsin